Allison "Allie" Ostrander (born December 24, 1996) is an American long-distance runner from Soldotna, Alaska. The repeat NCAA Division I steeplechase champion in 2017, 2018 and 2019, she competed for the Boise State University Broncos. In July 2019, Ostrander announced her plans to forgo her final season of NCAA eligibility and begin running professionally.

Personal life
Ostrander was born in Kenai, Alaska in 1996, the daughter of Teri and Paul Ostrander. She has an older sister, Taylor, who was a top middle distance, steeplechase and cross country runner for Kenai Central High School and at the NCAA Division III Willamette University, where she had a best steeple time of 10:40:06 as a sophomore in 2014.

A standout in both athletics and academics, Ostrander graduated from Kenai Central high school in 2015. She began competing in the steeplechase while running for the Boise State Broncos, where she was an Honors student, finishing with a 4.0 Grade Point Average.

Ostrander frequently competes in the Mount Marathon Race in Seward, Alaska, which she began running in grade school. She won the half-distance, junior version of the race six consecutive times from 2009-2014, beating not only the girls but the boys in her final year of the Junior race. In 2015, in her first senior race, which climbs to the 3,022-foot summit and returns to sea level, she finished under the standing 25-year-old female runners record, but was beaten by world skyrunning champion Emelie Forsberg. In 2017, Ostrander won with her best time to date, 49:19.

In 2021, Ostrander was hospitalized for treatment of an unspecified eating disorder. She bounced back to run in the Olympic Trials, setting a personal best of (9:26.96) for the steeplechase while finishing in 8th place in the finals. She had qualified for the 10,000-meter run but chose to forego the event.

Her domestic partner is fellow Brooks Beasts middle-distance runner and host of YouTube channel The Athlete Special, Spencer Brown.

High school career 
Ostrander played on the basketball team as well as running, being coached by her mother in the latter. Her main events were in cross country, hurdles (48.31 PR for 300m), and distance running. She won her first state 4A (large school) championship when only a sophomore. In 2013, despite only six weeks of training, she finished second to Alexa Efraimson of Washington state, clocking 10:03.66 in the prestigious Arcadia Invitational 3200m in California. In 2014, her senior year, she won the Nike National Cross-Country high school championship.

Collegiate career

2015
In September, Ostrander won the U20 World Mountain Running Championsips in Betws-y-Coed, Wales, UK. Later that month, she finished second in the 6 km Roy Griak Invitational cross country race. On October 16, she won the prestigious Wisconsin Adidas Invitational 6 km in 19:19.5. Two weeks later, she won her Mountain West Conference championship, followed in another two weeks by an NCAA Division I West Region victory. On November 21, she finished as the runner up in the 2015 NCAA Division I Cross Country Championships in 19:33.6, a performance others called remarkable for a freshman.

2016
In January, Ostrander set a personal record (PR) for 5000 m, with a 15.21.85 second-place performance at the University of Washington Invitational indoor meet. At the Husky Classic in February she set another PR, running 8:54.27 for 3,000 meters. Later that month she anchored her Broncos distance medley team to a first-place finish at the Mountain West Indoor Track and Field Championships, but was sidelined with an injury soon afterward. In July she finished in 8th place in the Olympic Trials 5,000 meters.

2017
Ostrander returned to form by winning the Stanford invitational 3000 m steeplechase in 9:55.61. In May, at the Mountain West Championships, she set a PR while winning the 10000 m running in 35:51.2. She finished second in the 5,000 in that meet with a time of 16:20.45. In June, she won the 2017 NCAA Division I Outdoor Track and Field Championships steeplechase title in 9:41.31. Just a few hours later, she finished fourth in the 5,000 meters. In November, she ended her hiatus from cross country finishing second in the 6,000 meters in the NCAA West Region Championships with a career best time of 19:16.5, then finishing fourth at the NCAA Championships on November 18.

2018
Running as a redshirt sophomore at the Mountain West Indoor Championships in February, she set a PR for the mile run in 4:46.06, finished second in the 3,000 meters, and again anchored Boise State's winning distance medley squad. On May 10, 2018, Ostrander finished less than a second behind collegiate event record holder Karissa Schweizer in the 2018 NCAA Division I Indoor Track and Field Championships at 3,000 meters, registering a time of 8:54.35. On March 29, 2018 moving outdoors, she set a PR, winning the Stanford Invitational, with a steeple time of 9:38.57. It was the world's fastest time in 2018 for the event by that date. Dropping in distance, she ran a PR 4:15.06 for 1500 m at the Bryan Clay Invitational. At the Mountain West Outdoor Championships, she won the 5,000 meters and finished second in the 1500. On May 25, 2018, Ostrander again qualified for the NCAA Outdoor Track and Field Championships by running 9:40.20 in winning the 3,000-meter steeplechase at the NCAA West Preliminary Championships in Sacramento, California. A day later, she qualified for the 5,000 meters as well, by finishing second in her heat in 15:27.46. In a repeat performance at the 2018 NCAA Outdoor Championships in Eugene, she posted the fastest time in the steeplechase preliminary heats, winning the final after running easily with the leaders for six laps, then leaving the other medalists five seconds behind. In the 5,000 meter race, a little over an hour later, she ran with the leaders until the last 200 meters, finishing eighth, less than five seconds behind first place.

On November 9, Ostrander won the NCAA Division I West Region Cross Country Championships, prevailing over a formidable field by 13.5 seconds, in a personal best of 19:09.0/ Her effort helped take the Broncos to finish as the second team, four points behind Oregon. On November 17, along with Anna Rohrer she led the tightly packed leaders through the first 4,000 meters of the NCAA Championship. She faded slightly toward the end, finishing sixth to Colorado's Dani Jones in 19:56.9, 1.7 seconds out of fourth place. Her efforts guided the Broncos to a 6th place team finish. On December 1, she began her indoor track season by setting a PR in the 5,000 meters, running 15:16.38 in the Boston University, finishing fourth, 1.6 seconds out of 1st place. She was just behind NCAA Division I distance running standouts, Kenyans Sharon Lokedi of the University of Kansas, and Ednah Kurgat and Eritrean Weini Kelati, both of the University of New Mexico.

2019
On January 26, Ostrander broke the Boise State school record for the mile at the University of Washington Indoor Meet, setting a personal record 4:35.79, for third place, .59 seconds behind Nike Oregon Track Club's Hanna Green and Oklahoma State University's Sinclare Johnson. With her running the mile leg, her distance medley team set a school record. At the Stanford Invitational on March 29, 2019, Ostrander bypassed the steeple to run the invitational 10,000m, finishing third in 32.06.7, the year's best time through April by a collegian, to professionals Emily Sisson and U.S. record holder Molly Huddle. On May 2, she returned to the steeple at the Payton Jordan Invitational in Stanford, California, to win in her closest finish ever, .05 seconds over New Mexico State's Adva Cohen. On June 8, as a redshirt junior, she repeated her NCAA steeple win, marking the first-ever woman to win the event three straight times. Her winning time was 9:37.73, breaking her own stadium record and setting a personal best in 98-degree heat. New Mexico Lobos standout Charlotte Prouse, finished second, almost seven seconds behind. On June 30, she finished 13th with a personal best of 9:31.44 in a star-studded international field in Palo Alto, California, at the Prefontaine Classic. She was the fourth American in the race.

Professional career

2019-2021 
After the 2019 Prefontaine Classic race, Ostrander decided to forego her last seasons of college eligibility to go professional. She signed contracts with agent Ray Flynn, and with Brooks Running to become a member of the Brooks Beasts Track Club, under the tutelage, in Seattle, of Danny Mackey. On July 28, Ostrander finished fourth in the steeplechase at the 2019 USA Track & Field Outdoor Championships, trailing the trio who had represented the United States in the 2016 Summer Olympics. Because Emma Coburn, who ran 9:25.63 was the defending World Champion from 2017, and consequently was an automatic qualifier to the 2019 World Championships, U.S. record-holder Courtney Frerichs, who ran 9:26.61, Colleen Quigley, with a 9:30.97, and Ostrander, at 9:38.52, all also qualified to run in Doha, Qatar in September.  On September 8, she ran in New York City's extremely competitive Fifth Avenue Mile, running the road race in 4:33.5 and finishing 16th out of the 20 elite runners. In February 2020, she won the 3,000 at the venerable Millrose Games in New York City, in a personal best of 8:48:94 despite a nagging Achilles injury. In Doha, Ostrander had run 9:30:85 in her heat, barely missing the final, while trimming seven seconds off her Personal Best. On April 2, 2020, she received platelet-rich plasma (PRP) therapy to help accelerate the healing of her torn Achilles tendon. She trained at altitude in New Mexico with NCAA 1500 meter champion teammates Karisa Nelson, and Marta Pen Freitas, and 5000 runner Allie Buchalski. Also in 2020, Ostrander began a volunteer coaching position with the NCAA DII distance running program at Seattle Pacific University.

In 2021, Ostrander ended her contract with Brooks in order to step away from professional running and put her mental and physical health first.

2023-Present 
In February 2023 Ostrander signed a contract with NNormal. In a Q&A on her youtube channel days later, she announced that she would focus more on trail running, but still plans to run some track races in the future.

Competitions

Honors 
 2015 World Mountain Running Championships Junior Champion
 2019 NCAA Outdoor Track and Field First-Team All-America- 3000m steeplechase,
 NCAA Outdoor Track and Field Second-Team All-America- 5,000m, 
 Mountain West Outdoor Track and Field Champion- 5,000m
 First-Team All-America- Indoor 3000m
First-Team All-America- Indoor 5000m
 NCAA Elite 90 Award Winner- Indoor Track and Field
 Mountain West Champion- Distance Medley Relay
 Mountain West Conference Champion- Indoor 3000m
 2018 Cross Country NCAA All-American
 NCAA West Region Cross Country Champion
 NCAA Outdoor Track and Field First-Team All-America- 5,000m
 Mountain West Outdoor Track and Field Champion- 5,000m
 NCAA Indoor Track and Field First-Team All-American- 3,000m
 NCAA Indoor Track and Field First-Team All-American, Distance Medley Relay
 Mountain West Champion- Distance Medley Relay
 2016. 2018, 2019 Honda Sports Award Finalist- Cross Country
 NCAA Elite 90 Award Winner- Cross Country
 NCAA 5,000m First-Team All-American

Critique of athletics coverage 
In 2018, NCAA commentator Jill Montgomery referred to Ostrander as the NCAA steeplechase, as the "baby-faced assassin," and said she looked like she still played with "Barbie Dolls". Dwight Stones said,  "She may look like she was just playing with her 'Barbies,' but she’s the reigning National Champ." In 2019, Ostrander wrote, "This year, the commentators found it necessary to state (incorrectly I might add) my height and weight multiple times. Not only were these comments objectifying and unnecessary, they drew attention away from the real focus of the event. People attend this event and listen to the commentary because they want to see what we're capable of, not what we look like we're capable of. So why do the commentators insist on providing information that has nothing to do with the sport? In a sport where eating disorders and body dysmorphia are so common, the media has an opportunity to help women (and men) feel capable and powerful and worthy, but by focusing on appearance and body proportions, this opportunity is missed." ESPN subsequently responded with a statement regarding the comments in question, saying: "We greatly appreciate Allie bringing this important conversation to light. Commentary about height & weight was not broadcast on ESPN."

References

External links
 2017 Mt. Marathon win and interview
 

1996 births
Living people
American female middle-distance runners
American female long-distance runners
American female steeplechase runners
American female track and field athletes
American female cross country runners
Boise State Broncos women's cross country runners
Boise State Broncos women's track and field athletes
People from Soldotna, Alaska
Sportspeople from Alaska
21st-century American women
Track and field athletes from Alaska